Euhyponomeuta stannella is a moth of the  family Yponomeutidae. It is found in most of Europe, except the Iberian Peninsula, most of the Balkan Peninsula, Ireland, the Netherlands, Belgium, the Baltic region and Denmark.

The wingspan is 14–19 mm. Adults are on wing from June to August.

The larvae feed on Sedum telephium from within a silken tube or tent.

References

Toll, S.Gr.v., 1941, Die Genitalien der europäischen Hyponomeuta. -  Zeitschrift des Wiener Entomologen-vereines (26): 170-176, Pl. XVII-XX.

Moths described in 1788
Yponomeutidae
Moths of Europe